Uvs, is one of the 21 aimags (provinces) of Mongolia.

The province is named after Mongolia’s biggest lake, Uvs Lake.

Geography 
Parts of the steppe in this province are protected as the World Heritage Site Ubsunur Hollow. In the south and west it borders for  each of Khovd and Bayan-Ölgii provinces for. The province occupies 4.45 percent of the national territory, totalling . Of the total area of the province, sixty percent belongs to the mountainous climatic zone, and forty percent to the Gobi semi-desert.

Population 
Mongols and their proto-peoples have lived in the province since antiquity. Currently, 42.3% of population is Dörbet, 34.2% is Bayid and 13.6% is Khalkha. Also, there are many Tuvans, Khotons, and Kazakhs living in this province.

At the end of 2014, 20,719 households were residing in this province. 7,476 lived in the provincial center Ulaangom, 4,105 lived in sum centers, and 9,138 lived in the countryside as herding families.

History 
After the Mongolian Revolution of 1921, the government founded the Jewel Mountain Province. This province included the whole western part of the country. In 1931 it was split into the Khovd and Dörvöd aimags—the latter which was renamed Uvs aimag in 1933.

Administrative subdivisions 
Uvs province is divided into 19 sums, lower administrative division units.

 Ulaangom is the Uvs province center.

Livestock 

Source: National Statistical Office of Mongolia

References 

 
Provinces of Mongolia
States and territories established in 1931
1931 establishments in Mongolia